Joggie Viljoen may refer to:

 Joggie Viljoen (rugby union, born 1945), South African national rugby union player
 Joggie Viljoen (rugby union, born 1976), South African rugby union player